John P. Walsh, Ph.D. is an associate professor at the USC Davis School of Gerontology as well as a member of USC's Neuroscience Program.  His main research interest is the physiology of basal ganglia-related brain disease.

Career 

Walsh's research career focuses on understanding how synapses in the basal ganglia, and in particular, corticostriatal synapses are modified by use or experience and how these use-dependent changes in synapses strength translate into behavior. A particular focus has been the role played by dopamine in guiding "plasticity" at corticostriatal synapses and how pathology in dopamine function in disease impacts the ability of the basal ganglia to process information.

Walsh is also a dedicated surfer and was interviewed on the brain chemistry and biological advantages of UFC fighter Randy Couture on the ESPN2 special The Body Issue in 2010.

Honors and awards
Honors: USC Associates Award for Excellence in Teaching - 2013

Awards: Walsh has also won several awards for his technology-based innovations for science education, including the USC Provost Prize for Teaching with Technology in 2008 as well as earning a $149,891 grant by the National Science Foundation to create an online learning tool. and Walsh won a $199,076 grant by the National Science Foundation for their Transforming Undergraduate Education in Science (TUES) Program to supervise the development of the online multimedia teaching-tool

Publications

References 

University of Southern California faculty
American gerontologists
Living people
Year of birth missing (living people)